Napo or NAPO may refer to:
Napo County (那坡县), Baise, Guangxi, China
Napoleon Bonaparte (1769–1821), French Military and Political Leader
Napo River, a tributary to the Amazon River that rises in Ecuador
Napo Province, a province in Ecuador
Napo District, a district of Maynas, Peru
Napo, Tianyang County (那坡镇), town in Guangxi, China
Napo (trade union), a UK trade union that represents probation officers and CAFCASS reporters
Novosibirsk Aircraft Production Association, an aircraft production company in Russia
National Association of Police Organizations, US umbrella lobbying organization of police officers and officers associations
Pizza a la napolitana, an Argentine dish